Schwebebahn is German for suspension railway and may refer to the following examples in Germany:

 Schwebebahn Dresden, the Dresden Suspension Railway in Dresden, Saxony
 Schwebebahn Wuppertal, the Wuppertal Suspension Railway in Wuppertal, North Rhine-Westphalia